Larry Rinker (born July 20, 1957) is an American professional golfer.

Rinker was born in Stuart, Florida. He played college golf at the University of Florida and turned professional in 1979.

Rinker initially played on mini-tours before joining the PGA Tour in 1981, and regained his tour card via qualifying school for 1982, the first year of the all-exempt tour. His best year came in 1985, when he finished 30th on the money list. He never won on tour, but recorded two runners-up finishes, at the 1984 USF&G Classic and the 1985 Bing Crosby National Pro-Am. His best finish in a major was tied-12th at the 1992 Open Championship. He also finished tied-15th at the 1982 U. S. Open, where he was in the final group for the third round alongside leader Bruce Devlin.

Rinker's brother, Lee, and his sister, Laurie, are also professional golfers. Sister-in-law Kelli, wife of older brother Laine, was also on the LPGA Tour. In 1985 Larry and Laurie Rinker teamed together to win the JCPenney Classic.

Since leaving the Tour, Rinker is now teaching full-time in Florida and has written three books, "Rinker's 5 Fundamentals," "The Upper Core Swing" and "The Journeyman." He was the host of a golf instruction show, "Rinker's Golf Tips," on SiriusXM PGA Tour Radio 2013-2020.

Amateur wins
1978 Southeastern Conference Championship

Professional wins
1980 6 mini-tour wins
1985 JCPenney Classic (with Laurie Rinker)

Results in major championships

CUT = missed the half-way cut
"T" = tied

See also
Spring 1981 PGA Tour Qualifying School graduates
1982 PGA Tour Qualifying School graduates
1983 PGA Tour Qualifying School graduates
1996 PGA Tour Qualifying School graduates

External links

American male golfers
Florida Gators men's golfers
PGA Tour golfers
Golfers from Florida
People from Stuart, Florida
People from Jupiter, Florida
Sportspeople from Winter Park, Florida
1957 births
Living people